The Saugatuck Reservoir is a reservoir in Fairfield County, Connecticut, United States, that straddles the border between the towns of Redding, Weston, and Easton. Its completion is marked by the creation of the Samuel P. Senior dam  of the Saugatuck River in January 1942, and provides water to several of the nearby towns. The reservoir is surrounded by the Centennial Watershed State Forest and a small section of the Trout Brook Valley State Park Reserve on the southeast end of the reservoir. The Saugatuck Reservoir utilizes an uncontrolled spillway adjacent to the Samuel P. Senior dam that effectively limits the maximum water level. There is also a concrete levee positioned on the southeastern side of the reservoir that prevents water from flooding Trout Brook Valley.

Bridgeport Hydraulic Company Holdings (now owned by Aquarion) flooded the Saugatuck River Valley after 1938, removing the villages of Hull and Valley Forge to create the Saugatuck Reservoir.

Aquarion Water Co., owner of the reservoir and dam, allows tailrace fishing in one area at the Weston end of the reservoir, where it has constructed a handicapped-access area. However, anglers must obtain a permit from Aquarion before fishing in the Saugatuck.

The Saugatuck is the largest of the eight reservoirs that make up Aquarion’s greater Bridgeport water system.

The following fish species may be found within the Saugatuck Reservoir:

 American eel
 Bluegill (Sunfish)
 Brook trout
 Brown trout
 Bullhead catfish
 Chain pickerel
 Crappie
 Largemouth bass
 Pumpkinseed (Sunfish)
 Rainbow trout
 Rock bass
 Smallmouth bass
 Walleye
 White perch
 Yellow perch

References

External links
Saugatuck Reservoir Trail, Centennial Watershed, State Forest, Easton, Newtown, Redding, Weston - DEP

Redding, Connecticut
Weston, Connecticut
Reservoirs in Connecticut
Lakes of Fairfield County, Connecticut
Protected areas of Fairfield County, Connecticut